Rizziconi is a comune (municipality) in the Province of Reggio Calabria in the Italian region Calabria, located about  southwest of Catanzaro and about  northeast of Reggio Calabria.

The municipality of Rizziconi contains the frazioni (subdivisions, mainly villages and hamlets) Drosi, Cirello, Spina, and Russo.

Rizziconi borders the following municipalities: Cittanova, Gioia Tauro, Oppido Mamertina, Rosarno, Seminara, Taurianova.

Mafia infiltration of city council
The city council of Rizziconi was dissolved in 2001 because of influence by the 'Ndrangheta. The town is home to the 'ndrina of Teodoro Crea.

Demographic evolution

References

External links
 www.comune.rizziconi.rc.it

Cities and towns in Calabria